Fermanagh and Tyrone can refer to:

Fermanagh and Tyrone (Northern Ireland Parliament constituency)
Fermanagh and Tyrone (UK Parliament constituency)